This  list of Southeast Asian countries by GDP provides a list of Southeast Asian countries according to their respective gross domestic products (GDP).

References
List of countries by GDP (nominal)

Southeast Asia
GDP